There is a sizable community of people of Indian origin living in Uganda. In 2003, there were an estimated 15,000 people of Asian descent (majority of Indians and Pakistanis) living in Uganda, compared to approximately 80,000 before they were expelled by the dictator Idi Amin in 1972.

Many returned to Uganda in the 1980s and 1990s and have once again gone on to dominate the country's economy. Despite making up less than 1% of the population, they are estimated to contribute up to 65% of the country's tax revenues. Sudhir Ruparelia, who is of Indian origin, is the richest man in Uganda and has an estimated fortune of $1 billion.

History

In 1895 construction of the Uganda Railway began. The Imperial British East Africa Company awarded Alibhai Mulla Jeevanjee, an agent based in Karachi, with the contract to supply the required labour force. Jeevanjee recruited his workforce from the Punjab region of British India. The first group to arrive had a total of 350 men, and over a six-year period, a total of 31,895 men worked on the project. Some died, others returned to India after the end of their contracts, and others chose to stay. The population was later bolstered by Gujarati traders called "passenger Indians", both Hindu and Muslim free migrants who came to serve the economic needs of the indentured labourers and to capitalize on the economic opportunities.

Over time, Indians became prosperous and dominated much of the Ugandan economy, with some acting in the role of 'colonial overseers' for the British regime, which prompted the rise of resentment and Indophobia. These resentments came to a crisis when Idi Amin ousted Milton Obote by military coup d'état in 1971. The following year, Amin ordered the expulsion of Asians living in Uganda. As a result, many Indians migrated to the United Kingdom, Canada, the United States, and elsewhere and began rebuilding their lives. After Amin's death, however, more Indians who were born in Uganda started migrating back.

Demographically, the number of people of mixed Ugandan-Indian heritage is not known (Multiracial Ugandans in Uganda).

Notable Ugandan people of Indian descent or notable people of Indian-Ugandan descent 
Akbar Baig - Ugandan cricketer
Alykhan Karmali - Ugandan industrialist
Charli XCX - British singer
Anup Singh Choudry - Former judge of the High Court of Uganda
Arif Virani - Member of Parliament (Canada)
Asif Din - English cricketer
Bharat Masrani - CEO of TD Canada Trust
Bhaskar Bhattacharya - Indian independent film-maker and scholar.
Hasmukh Dawda - Businessman
Irshad Manji - Canadian author
Jayesh Manek - Indian fund manager
Jitendra Patel - Canadian cricketer
 Kashif Siddiqi
Mahmood Mamdani - Ugandan academic
Mayur Madhvani - Ugandan industrialist
Miraj Barot - Businessman
Mobina Jaffer - Canadian senator
Mukesh Shukla - Ugandan industrialist
Nandi Rose Plunkett - American musician
Nandikishore Patel - Ugandan cricketer
Naomi Scott - English actress and singer
Nehal Bibodi - Ugandan cricketer
Omar Sachedina - Canadian journalist
Priti Patel - British politician
Peter Nazareth - Ugandan-American author
Rajat Neogy - Ugandan-American poet, Founder & First Editor of Transition Magazine
Salma Lakhani -19th Lieutenant Governor of Alberta
Shailesh Vara - British politician
Shekhar Mehta - Kenyan rally driver
Shimit Amin -  Indian film director 
Sikander Lalani - Ugandan steel magnate
Sudhir Ruparelia - Ugandan businessman
Suresh Dalal - Ugandan & American Attorney
Wilfred de Souza - Politician and Chief Minister of Goa
Walter de Sousa - Indian field hockey player.
Supra Singhal - Ugandan swimmer

See also
 India–Uganda relations

References

External links
 Demographics of Uganda
 Indian Diaspora in Africa
 Indians of East Africa

Asian diaspora in Uganda
Uganda
Indian diaspora in Africa